Multiday races are ultramarathon running events which are typically either segmented into daily events of a specified distance or time, or staged so that runners can run as far as they want, at their own discretion, over a set course or over a set number of days. Multiday races can range from continuous 48-hour track events to staged transcontinental treks.

Beyond the marathon

Common ultra events include  and 100 kilometer races. Ultras are usually considered to include all events of 50 kilometers or longer. Depending on the degree of terrain difficulty, up to 30 hours or more is generally allowed for runners to complete typical ultras, for example the Badwater Ultramarathon.

Types of courses
Many multiday races are held on tracks or measured loops, which eases provision of aid station support for runners. Stage races are the alternative; these include point to point races such as the Trans-American races, which traverse the North American continent coast to coast, and the Gobi March, a seven-day journey across the Gobi desert, the Kalahari Augrabies Extreme Marathon, a 7-day, 250 km trail event in the Kalahari Desert, and the Yukon Arctic Ultra, a 430/300/100/26 mile challenge crossing Yukon in the dead of winter.

Longer multiday races include the Trans-Europe race, which ran from Lisbon to Moscow in 2003, a distance of about 5,100 kilometers. These events take the runner to a different level, where the race becomes a way of life and where nutrition, sleep, energy and psychological states have to be carefully managed. The Self-Transcendence 3100 Mile Race is the longest certified footrace in the world.

The past
The golden era of multiday races stretches back to the 1870s and 1880s, when they were held on indoor tracks and offered substantial prizes. Known as pedestrians, these athletes established records which in some cases have stood until recently. In summer 1809 in Newmarket, England, Robert Barclay Allardice, better known as Captain Barclay, ran/walked one mile (1.6 km) for each consecutive hour, each consecutive day, totalling .

The most common multiday race of the era was the six-day race, which ran from Monday to Saturday with Sunday being observed as a rest day. In 1878, Sir John Dugdale Astley was inspired to create a series of five international six-day races, in which competitors vied for the Astley Belt. Two early competitors were the American Edward Payson Weston, who covered  in 6 days. The Englishman Charles Rowell covered 241 km in the first day of a 6-day races in the 1880s.

By the early 1890s, public enthusiasm for such events had moved into bicycle racing, and the multiday running craze came to an end. Interest grew again in the late 1920s, with the advent of Trans-America races. These events were transcontinental stage races that inspired a new generation to challenge the huge distance. There was little reward for these races in the long run, and it was not until the 1980s that interest re-awoke in true multi-day races. In 1980, San Francisco postal delivery worker  organized the first modern era six-day race, on a track in Woodside, California.

The present
In recent years, several multi-day races have stood out, among them the Australian Westfield Sydney to Melbourne races, which were run from 1983–1991, and the Colac (1983–2005) race which is no longer being held. August 2012 will see possibly the final 64 stage Trans-Europe race organised by Ingo Schulze.
Sri Chinmoy Races hosts several multi-day events annually in the US: six- and ten-day races, a 3,100-mile (5,000 km) race, 700-, 1,000- and  races, and several 24- and 48-hour events in Europe, Asia, Australia and New Zealand. Trans-Gaule, Trans-Germany - the Deutschlandlauf, Trans-Korea as well as occasional Trans-Am and Trans-Australia races plus several 6 day events in Europe and South Africa. The RacingThePlanet's 4 Deserts Race Series and the Marathon des Sables are among the most popular multiday races taking place today.

Notable pedestrians
 Edward Payson Weston
 Daniel O'Leary
 Foster Powell
 Charles Rowell
 Fred Hitchborn
 George Littlewood
 Robert Barclay Allardice

Notable multiday runners
 Ashprihanal Pekka Aalto
 Suprabha Beckjord
 Sandy Barwick
 
 Dipali Cunningham
 Serge Girard, trans-USA (1997), trans-South America (2001), trans-Africa (2003/2004) and trans-Eurasia (2005/2006) record holder
 Al Howie
 Rimas Jakelaitis
 Yiannis Kouros
 Achim Heukemes, trans-Australia record holder
 Surasa Mairer
 Lorna Michael, first woman to complete trans-USA (1993)
 Stu Mittleman, US record holder for six-day race (578 miles)
 Wolfgang Schwerk
 William Sichel, World #1 for 6-day race in 2009,  World M55 record holder
 Samuel Thompson, Ran  in 50 consecutive marathon races (August 19, 2006)
 kobi oren

Well-known multiday races
4 Deserts Atacama Crossing, Gobi March, Sahara Race, The Last Desert
Australian 6 Day Race
Antibes 6 Day Race
Across The Years
Athens International Ultramarathon Festival (24/48/72h, 6 days, 1000k, 1000m) 
Cliff Young Australian 6-day race 
Marathon des Sables
Self-Transcendence 6- & 10-day Race
Self-Transcendence 3100 Mile Race
Surgères 48 Hour Race
Trans Europe Foot Race 2009
Vienna-Bratislava-Budapest Supermarathon
Kalahari Augrabies Extreme Marathon 
UltraCentric
World Marathon Challenge
Yukon Arctic Ultra

See also
 International Association of Ultrarunners
 Ultrarunning
 Beach Walking

References

External links
 German Ultramarathon Association News results and statistics
 I Run Far Ultrarunning news
 Multidays.com - 'A resource for the multiday runner:  Multiday and Ultrarunning news.'
 Sri Chinmoy Races.org - 'The worldwide home of the Sri Chinmoy Marathon Team' (hosts of multiday races around the world)
 ULTRAmarathonRunning.com Global Ultramarathon Races & Events Calendar
 Yanoo.net - French ultrarunning news and home of the 'Transe Gaule' (trans-France event)

!
Running by type